Kelvin Martin (born September 10, 1989) is an American basketball player for Shiga Lakes of the Japanese B.League. Martin played college basketball for CSU. After turning professional in 2012, Martin played for several clubs in the Netherlands, Germany and Italy. In 2019, he won the Basketball Champions League with Virtus Bologna.

Professional career
Martin started his professional career with Matrixx Magixx of the Dutch Basketball League (DBL). In his rookie season, he averaged 15.4 points and 5.7 rebounds per game with Magixx. On January 5, 2014, Martin re-signed with the Magixx for the remainder of the 2013–14 season.

In his third professional season, Martin played with German side MLP Academics Heidelberg of the second tier ProA. He averaged 15.1 points, 5.4 rebounds and 1.8 assists in 30 games with Heidelberg.

During the 2018–19 season, Martin played with Virtus Bologna and won the Basketball Champions League trophy with the team.

On June 22, 2019, he has signed with Happy Casa Brindisi of the Lega Basket Serie A. Martin averaged 8.9 points, 6.7 rebounds, 2.2 assists and 1.6 steals per game in Serie A. He signed with Dolomiti Energia Trento of the Italian Lega Basket Serie A on August 13, 2020.

On August 14, 2020, Martin signed a one-year agreement with Aquila Basket Trento in the Italian Lega Basket Serie A (LBA) and EuroCup.

On September 10, 2021, Martin returned to MLP Academics Heidelberg in the German Bundesliga.

Honours

Club
Virtus Bologna
Basketball Champions League: 2018–19

References

1989 births
Living people
American expatriate basketball people in Germany
American expatriate basketball people in Italy
American expatriate basketball people in the Netherlands
American men's basketball players
Aquila Basket Trento players
Basketball players from Georgia (U.S. state)
Charleston Southern Buccaneers men's basketball players
Dutch Basketball League players
Fortitudo Agrigento players
Lega Basket Serie A players
Matrixx Magixx players
New Basket Brindisi players
People from Cook County, Georgia
Riesen Ludwigsburg players
Small forwards
USC Heidelberg players
Vanoli Cremona players
Virtus Bologna players